Norma Cole (born May 12, 1945) is a Canadian poet, visual artist, translator, and curator. An Anglophone Canadian by birth, Cole learned French at an early age, and went on to translate the works of French poets Emmanuel Hocquard, Danielle Collobert, Jean Daive, and others with whom she is intellectually allied. In the late 1970s and 1980s Cole was a member of the San Francisco-based circle of poets congregating around Robert Duncan. Her papers are collected at the Archive for New Poetry at the Mandeville Special Collections Library, University of California San Diego.

Early life and career
She was born in Toronto, Canada to an Anglophone family, Norma Cole began learning French in middle school. Cole studied at the University of Toronto, where she received a B.A. in Modern Languages and Literature (French and Italian) in 1967 and an M.A. in French Language and Literature in 1969.

After university, Cole moved to France in time to absorb the revolutionary atmosphere of the aftermath of the May '68 general strike. She spent several years living in a small village in the foothills of the Alpes-Maritimes near Nice. During this period in France, Cole began drawing, sculpting, and establishing relationships with many contemporary French poets.

In the early 1970s Cole returned to Toronto, before migrating to San Francisco in 1977, where she has lived ever since. Upon her arrival to the Bay Area, Cole got a job in the public school system, but it was through her association with New College of California that she met her core community of poets, including Robert Duncan, Michael Palmer, David Levi Strauss, Susan Thackrey, Aaron Shurin, and Laura Moriarty. However she continued to spend time in France, and her association with French poets has been crucial to her work. Important French connections have included Claude Royet-Journoud, Emmanuel Hocquard, and Joseph Simas, who published her first book, Mace Hill Remap.

Norma Cole is the recipient of the Gerbode Poetry Prize and a grant from the Fund for Poetry. In 2006 she was awarded a grant from the Foundation for Contemporary Arts Grants to Artists Award. "The Poetics of Vertigo" — delivered as the 1998 "George Oppen Memorial Lecture" for The Poetry Center, SFSU — won the Robert D. Richardson Non-Fiction Award. With Boston photographer Ben E. Watkins she won the Purchase Award for their photo/text collaboration, "They Flatter Almost Recognize."

Recent projects
Norma Cole's work has received great acclaim for her: "openness to traditions and practices, artists and writings, radically divergent from her own".  Recently, she collaborated with The Poetry Center & American Poetry Archives at SFSU in honor of their fiftieth anniversary. There she helped to create a site-specific gallery installation titled Collective Memory which opened on December 11, 2004  and ran through April 16, 2005. The project was described as:

"...a departure from her earlier work, extending what has been primarily a written, literary practice to the expanded dimensions of a public space.... Aimed at exploring and embodying the creative process involved in making poetry, Cole...worked both on site and off, inviting, responding to, and incorporating into her text the comments, perceptions, and contributions of visitors...opening the possibilities for more active exchange with others.... Aspects of the installation [were changed] over time, providing an evolving and adaptable creative space, altered by the objects and people moving through it.... [T]he project...openly demonstrate[s] that poetry making is not an insular and isolated activity, acceptable as long as it's on the perimeter of society, but an integrated art form based in communal exchange, from which we need to learn."

Selected works

Poetry, prose, books, and chapbooks
Mace Hill Remap (Paris: Moving Letters, 1988). [ e-text version available: see External links below ]
Metamorphopsia (Poets & Poets, 1988).
My Bird Book (Littoral, 1991).
Mars (Listening Chamber, Berkeley, California  1994).
Moira (O Books, 1995).
Contrafact (Poets & Poets, 1996).
Quotable Gestures, (CREAPHIS/un bureau sur l'Atlantique, France, 1998)
Desire & its Double (Instress, 1998).
The Vulgar Tongue (a+bend, 2000).
Spinoza in Her Youth (Omnidawn Publishing, Richmond, CA, 2002) .
A little a & a (Seeing Eye Books, Los Angeles, 2002).
Burns (Belladonna Books, 2002).
Do the Monkey (Zasterle, 2006) .
Natural Light (Libellum, 2009) 
Where Shadows Will: Selected Poems 1988-2008 (City Lights Books, San Francisco, 2009) .
14000 Facts (A+Bend Press, 2009)
To Be At Music: Essays & Talks (Omnidawn Publishing, Richmond, CA, 2010) 
 Win These Posters and Other Unrelated Prizes Inside .  (Omnidawn Publishing, Richmond, CA, 2010)

Text and image
Scout, text/image work in CD ROM format, (Krupskaya, 2004).
At All: Tom Raworth & His Collages (Hooke Press, 2006).
Collective Memory (Granary Books, 2006), poetry/photos, with book design by Emily McVarish; based on Cole's extended installation/performance for the exhibition "Poetry and its Arts: Bay Area Interactions 1954-2004" (California Historical Society, San Francisco, CA, 2004–05).

Translations
It Then by Danielle Collobert (O Books, 1989).
The Surrealists Look at Art, essays by Aragon, Breton, Eluard, Soupault, Tzara, edited and translated with Michael Palmer, (Lapis Press, Venice, California, 1990).
This Story is Mine: Little Autobiographical Dictionary of Elegy by Emmanuel Hocquard, (Instress, 1999).
A Discursive Space: Interviews with Jean Daive by Anne-Marie Albiach, (Duration Press, Sausalito, California, 1999.
(editor and translator) Crosscut Universe, an anthology of poetry / poetics by contemporary French writers, (Burning Deck, 2000).
Nude by Anne Portugal [Le Plus simple appareil], (Kelsey Street Press, Berkeley, California, 2001)
Distant Noise by Jean Frémon, (with Lydia Davis, Serge Gavronsky, Cole Swensen), (Avec Books, Penngrove, California, 2003).
Notebooks 1956-1978 by Danielle Collobert, (Litmus Press, 2003) 
The Spirit God and the Properties of Nitrogen by Fouad Gabriel Naffah (Post-Apollo Press, Sausalito, California, 2004).

References

External links
Norma Cole Papers MSS 0766. Special Collections & Archives, UC San Diego Library.
Norma Cole @durationpress.com includes e-book text of Cole's Mace Hill Remap archived here
Collective Memory Cole's site-specific installation for "The Poetry Center"
Correspondence between Wendy Tronrud and Norma Cole
"Speech Production: Themes and Variations" poem by Cole at Shampoo website
"Yellow and...: A Response to the Poetry of Marjorie Welish.": talk on the U.S. poet and painter Marjorie Welish, recorded 5 April 2002; Slought Foundation Online Content; access/download recorded audio
Contemplating Table(t)s Marjorie Welish reviews Spinoza in Her Youth by Norma Cole on-line at Jacket Magazine
Norma Cole, Writing as Luminousness (Part 1) essay by poet and publisher Laura Hinton

1945 births
Living people
Canadian women poets
University of Toronto alumni
Canadian expatriate academics in the United States
Canadian expatriate writers in the United States
20th-century Canadian poets
20th-century Canadian women writers
21st-century Canadian poets
21st-century Canadian women writers
Canadian translators